Thomas Mytton (ca. 1530 – 1563?) was an English politician.

He was a Member (MP) of the Parliament of England for Shrewsbury in November 1554.

References

1530s births
1560s deaths
English MPs 1554–1555